The 2018–19 Notre Dame Fighting Irish women's basketball team represented the University of Notre Dame during the 2018–19 NCAA Division I women's basketball season. The Fighting Irish, led by 32nd year head coach Muffet McGraw, played their home games at Edmund P. Joyce Center as members of the Atlantic Coast Conference. They were also the defending national champions.

Previous season
The Fighting Irish finished the 2017–18 season at 35–3
, 15–1 in ACC play to finish in a tie for first place. They were runners up in the ACC women's tournament losing to Louisville in the final game. They received an at large bid for the NCAA women's tournament as a number one seed. They won the tournament beating other number one seeds, Connecticut and Mississippi State along the way.  This was the team's second national title in its history.

Offseason

2018 recruiting class

Source:

Roster

Media
All Notre Dame games will air on WHPZ Pulse 96.9 FM. Games are streamed online live.

Schedule and results

|-
!colspan=9 style=|Exhibition

|-
!colspan=9 style=| Regular season

|-
!colspan=9 style=| ACC Women's Tournament
|-

|-
!colspan=9 style=| NCAA Women's Tournament
|-

Rankings

The Coaches Poll releases a final poll after the NCAA tournament, but the AP Poll does not release a poll at this time.

References

Notre Dame Fighting Irish women's basketball seasons
Notre Dame
Notre Dame Fighting Irish
Notre Dame Fighting Irish
Notre Dame
NCAA Division I women's basketball tournament Final Four seasons